Dan Buckingham (born 25 September 1980) is a wheelchair rugby player from New Zealand, and was a member of the national team, the Wheel Blacks for 16 years. He worked as CEO for the Television Production Company Attitude, and is now the CE of Able (www.able.co.nz).

Early life
Dan was born in Invercargill, New Zealand, and grew up in rural Southland. He is the youngest of 3 siblings.

He was educated at St Kevin's College (1994–96) and Verdon College (1997-98) where he captained the schools First XV rugby team.

In 1999 while attending Otago University he sustained a fracture dislocation to his C6/7 vertebrae while playing club rugby, resulting in paralysis from the chest down, with some loss of function to his hands.

He completed his rehabilitation at Burwood hospital, where he learned to use a manual wheelchair for mobility.

Domestic wheelchair rugby
Dan began training with the Canterbury wheelchair rugby team while still in the Burwood hospital spinal injury rehabilitation unit in 1999.

While living in Dunedin he continued to play for Canterbury in 2000, and played his first Nationals tournament for the province that year.

He moved to Christchurch in 2001, and continued to play for the club until 2007.

In 2008 Dan began playing for Auckland after moving to the city at the end of 2007. He coached the team from 2014 - 2016.

International wheelchair rugby
Dan first made the New Zealand team in 2001, playing a 5 test series against Australia for the Chris Handy Cup, held in Christchurch.

He has competed in four World Championships: Gothenburg 2002, Christchurch 2006, Vancouver 2010 and Odense 2014. He was part of the team that won Silver at the Christchurch 2006 World Championships; the Wheel Blacks lost to the US in the final.

He competed as part of the Wheel Blacks in the Athens 2004 Paralympic Games where they won the gold medal, as well as the Beijing 2008 Paralympic Games where they finished 5th.

Dan captained the Wheel Blacks from 2007 - 2013, and again from 2015 - 2016.

Dan has also competed for domestic clubs internationally, including Victoria in Australia, Denver and Lakeshore in the US, and Quebec in Canada.

Education
Dan attended boarding school at St Kevin's College in Oamaru from 1994 to 1996, before changing to Verdon College for his final two years from 1997 to 1998.

In 1999 he began studying to be a Surveyor through Otago University, but his studies were cut short when he broke his neck playing rugby in August of that year.

He returned to Otago and completed a Certificate in Fitness Management.

In 2003 Dan began a Bachelor of Arts at the University of Canterbury. He studied part-time while training and competing internationally in wheelchair rugby, and completed the degree at the end of 2006.

Career
In 2008 Dan began working for Attitude as a researcher and presenter. He became Associate Producer in 2011, overseeing post-production. At the end of 2012 he left the company, but returned in May 2013 to help launch the company's digital arm, AttitudeLive. He is currently General Manager

In 2014 Dan was appointed to the Auckland City Council Disability Advisory Panel.

References

External links 
 
 

1980 births
Living people
Paralympic wheelchair rugby players of New Zealand
Paralympic gold medalists for New Zealand
Wheelchair rugby players at the 2004 Summer Paralympics
Medalists at the 2004 Summer Paralympics
People educated at Verdon College
People educated at St Kevin's College, Oamaru
Paralympic medalists in wheelchair rugby